Saho may refer to:
Saho people, an ethnic group living largely in the Horn of Africa
Saho language, the language of the Saho people
Saaho, a 2019 film
Akari Saho (born 1995), Japanese musician
Saho Sasazawa, Japanese author
Saho Harada, Japanese synchronized swimmer
Lamin Saho, African singer

Language and nationality disambiguation pages